Cock Up Your Beaver is a song and poem by Robert Burns, written in 1792. It is written in Scottish dialect and the beaver refers to a gentleman's hat in an era when all high quality men's hats were made of felted beaver fur.

It was based on an older song, published as "Johnny, cock up thy Beaver". It is widely claimed that this is found in The Dancing Master, a collection of folk tunes published by John Playford of London in 1657.
However, this is disputed by Scottish music scholar John Glen who states it first appears in the 1686 edition of "The Dancing Master".

It was originally published in 1792 in volume 4 of the Scots Musical Museum and again in 1821 in a compilation by James Hogg, with four verses and musical notation of a tune.

The original version was English, and ridiculed Scotsmen who settled in London after the accession of James VI to the throne of England, possibly satirizing the costumes of highland chiefs entering the lowlands.

The song, hand-written by Burns, is in the Scots Musical Museum.

A piece entitled Carolan's Variations on the Scottish Air "Cock Up Your Beaver" is composition no. 204 in the oeuvre of Turlough O'Carolan.

References

External links 
Digitised copy of score for  Cock up your beaver in volume 4 of James Johnson's Scots Musical Museum, printed between 1792, from National Library of Scotland. JPEG, PDF, XML versions.
 Reading by Alan Cumming
 Wikisource

Scottish poetry
Scottish songs